Soul On Ice: Past, Present, & Future is a 2016 American documentary film directed, produced, and written by Damon Kwame Mason. The film tells the story of the Coloured Hockey League and the history of Black players in ice hockey in the United States and Canada.

Reception
The film has gained positive reviews from critics.

References

External links
 
 

2015 films
2010s biographical films
2015 documentary films
2010s historical films
American biographical films
American sports documentary films
American historical films
American independent films
Documentary films about ice hockey
Ice hockey in the United States
American ice hockey films
2010s English-language films
2010s American films